The 2021 Firestone Grand Prix of Monterey was an IndyCar motor race held on September 19, 2021 at the WeatherTech Raceway Laguna Seca. It was the 15th round of the 2021 IndyCar Series. 

Andretti Autosport's Colton Herta won the race after leading 91 of 95 laps of the race, scoring his second win of the season and his second IndyCar win at Laguna Seca after he won the previous edition in 2019. Championship leader Álex Palou finished in second, ahead of rookie Romain Grosjean, who came third after gaining ten positions from his starting position, scoring his third IndyCar career podium.

Background 
The event, which was held on the weekend of September 17-19, 2021 at the WeatherTech Raceway Laguna Seca in Monterey, California, returned to the series after its absence in the 2020 season due to the COVID-19 pandemic. It was the penultimate race of the 2021 season, following the Grand Prix of Portland at the Portland International Raceway, which was held one week before this race, and preceding the season finale in the following week at the Streets of Long Beach.

Colton Herta was the previous race winner, having won the race in 2019 with Harding Steinbrenner Racing.

Championship standings before the race 
After his win at the Grand Prix of Portland, Álex Palou retook the championship lead with a 25-point advantage from Pato O'Ward, who only finished 14th and subsequently dropped to second place in the standings. Third-placed Josef Newgarden closed the difference to O'Ward into a nine-point gap with a fifth placed finish at Portland, while Scott Dixon and Marcus Ericsson improved their points tally in fourth and fifth respectively after strong finishes at Portland, with Dixon scoring a podium.

Honda remained in the lead of the manufacturer's standings over Chevrolet.

Entrants

Practice

Practice 1 
Practice 1 took place at 5:30 PM ET on September 17. The session saw numerous incidents happen, such as Colton Herta going off-track past the Corkscrew and Hélio Castroneves making contact with the tire barriers in Turn 2, though no major damage was caused. Josef Newgarden topped the first practice charts with a time of 01:11.7125, besting Herta in second and Álex Palou in third.

Practice 2 
Practice 2 took place at 1:45 PM ET on September 18. The session was marred with two red flags, which cut up to 20 minutes of session time. Dalton Kellett lost control of and crashed his No. 4 car in Turn 4, triggering the first red flag. After the session restarted, Rinus VeeKay crashed at nearly the same spot as Kellett did, bringing out the second red flag of the session. Both drivers were unharmed. Rookie Scott McLaughlin topped the session with the best time of 01:10.8755, with Colton Herta and Álex Palou finishing second and third fastest.

Qualifying 
Qualifying took place at 5:05 PM ET on September 18. Colton Herta took pole position with a time of 01:10.7994, ahead of Andretti teammate Alexander Rossi and Penske driver Will Power, who finished second and third respectively.

Qualifying classification 

 Notes
 Bold text indicates fastest time set in session.
  - Will Power was initially second fastest, but had his lap invalidated, as officials judged him to have failed to slow down during a local yellow caused by Pato O'Ward's spin at the Corkscrew.
  - Pato O'Ward had his best time invalidated due to a penalty for his spin at the Corkscrew.

Final Practice 
Warmup took place at 12:00 PM ET on September 19. Rookie Callum Ilott spun off into the tire barriers in Turn 6 during the session, causing a red flag. Ilott was uninjured. Alexander Rossi went fastest with a time of 01:12.8632, with Colton Herta finishing second and Takuma Sato finishing third.

Race 
The race started at 3:00 PM ET on September 19. On lap 2, race leader Colton Herta and Alexander Rossi made contact in Turn 2, as Rossi attempted to capitalize on a Herta mistake. However, while Herta managed to continue without problems, Rossi spun into the gravel and stalled, causing a caution as his car was restarted – he would later finish 25th, two laps behind. On lap 10, Will Power, who started third, suddenly had engine problems that prompted him to pit to resolve the issue – he finished the race two laps behind in 26th. Takuma Sato spun at the Corkscrew mid-race. As Sato's car stalled, it rolled backwards towards Scott Dixon, who attempted an evasive maneuver by driving off-track, but to no avail, as he suffered damage to his right sidepod and undertray. Dixon was forced to drive on with the damage and would later finish 13th.

Herta led most of the race, being in the lead for 91 of 95 laps. Romain Grosjean led the four remaining lead laps, as he made a surge to the front from thirteenth. Grosjean made several passes at the iconic Corkscrew corner, most notably his pass against fellow rookie Jimmie Johnson towards the end of the race, as Grosjean was quickly gaining to the lead pack after fitting on a fresh set of tires and as Johnson was defending to protect his teammate, Álex Palou, who was running in second place. The two were able to continue racing, but Grosjean's pace would dwindle after the incident.

Colton Herta won the race, clinching consecutive wins at the Monterey Grand Prix as he won the 2019 edition, repeating a feat achieved by his father, Bryan Herta, in 1998 and 1999. Championship leader Álex Palou finished second, extending his points lead over Pato O'Ward, who finished fifth, to 35 points. Rookie Romain Grosjean took his third IndyCar podium as he finished third, narrowing the gap in the battle for Rookie of the Year to fellow rookie Scott McLaughlin into 20 points. 2020 champion Scott Dixon saw his title hopes end, as the gap between him and Palou grew to 72 points, ruling out consecutive championship wins for Dixon.

Race classification

Championship standings after the race 
Honda clinched their fourth consecutive Manufacturer's Cup at Laguna Seca, as the top five finishers featured four Honda-powered cars. The drivers' championship was decided at the final race of the season, where Álex Palou needed to finish 12th or better to win the championship, with Pato O'Ward and Josef Newgarden mathematically still in contention.

Drivers' Championship standings

Engine manufacturer standings

 Note: Only the top five positions are included.
 Bold text indicates Championship Winners.

References

External links 

Monterey Grand Prix
Firestone Grand Prix
Firestone Grand Prix of Monterey